Rhabdophis plumbicolor, known as the green keelback or lead keelback, is a species of nonvenomous snake in the family Colubridae native to parts of the Indian subcontinent.

Description
See snake scales for terminology used

The eye is moderately large. The rostral scale is just visible from above. The suture between the internasals is as long as that between the prefrontals or a little shorter. The frontal scale is as long as its distance from the end of the snout or a little longer, as long as the parietals or a little shorter. The loreal scale is as long as deep or deeper, sometimes touching the eye. There are two preoculars scales and three or four postoculars. The temporals are 2 + 3 or 4. There are 7 scales on the upper lip (supralabials), the third and fourth touch the eye; and 4 or 5 lower labials in contact with the anterior chin-shields, which are shorter than the posterior. The dorsal scales are strongly keeled, in 23 to 27 rows at midbody. The ventrals scutes are 144-160 in number, and the anal is usually divided. The subcaudals scales are 35-50 in number. R. plumbicolor is dull green above, uniform or with traces of black markings. Young specimens show an inverted black V-mark on the neck, its apex  forwards, reaching to the frontal shield, and a second much smaller one behind, the intervening space being bright yellow or orange; a black stripe from the eye to the angle of the month, and more or less regular transverse spots or cross-bars on  the back and tail; belly whitish, yellow or plumbeous, rarely with darkish spots.

Behavior
In disposition R. plumbicolor is very gentle, and in threat may flatten the neck and raise the head like a cobra while other specimens may flatten the entire body on the ground.

Diet
R. plumbicolor feeds mainly on toads.

Geographic range and habitat
R. plumbicolor is found in peninsular India and Sri Lanka especially on the hills rather than on the plains. It is also found in Pune, Maharashtra, Bangladesh, Myanmar, and possibly Pakistan.

Reproduction
R. plumbicolor is oviparous.

Subspecies
Two subspecies are recognized as being valid, including the nominotypical subspecies.
Rhabdophis plumbicolor palabariya  – Sri Lanka
Rhabdophis plumbicolor plumbicolor  – Asian mainland

References

Further reading
Boulenger GA (1893). Catalogue of the Snakes in the British Museum (Natural History). Volume I., Containing the Families ... Colubridæ Aglyphæ, part. London: Trustees of the British Museum (Natural History). (Taylor and Francis, printers). xiii + 448 pp. + Plates I-XXVIII. (Macropisthodon plumbicolor, new combination, pp. 267-268).
Cantor TE (1839) "Spicilegium serpentium indicorum [parts 1 and 2]". Proc. Zool. Soc. London 7: 31-34, 49-55. (Tropidonotus plumbicolor, new species, p. 54). (in English and Latin).
Jerdon TC (1853). "Catalogue of Reptiles inhabiting the Peninsula of India [parts 1 and 2]". J. Asiat. Soc. Bengal 22: 462-479, 522-534. (Tropidonotus plumbicolor, 530).
Wall F (1921). Ophidia Taprobanica or the Snakes of Ceylon. Colombo, Ceylon [Sri Lanka]: Colombo Museum. (H.R. Cottle, Government Printer). xxiii + 581 pp. (Macropisthodon plumbicolor, pp. 128-134, Figures 30-31).

Reptiles of Myanmar
Reptiles of India
Reptiles of Sri Lanka
Rhabdophis
Reptiles described in 1839
Taxa named by Theodore Edward Cantor